"Boten Anna" ("Anna the Bot") is a song by Swedish musician Basshunter, from his first studio album, LOL. Following the single's release in 2006, Basshunter gained popularity in his native Sweden, as well as Finland, Denmark, Iceland, Norway, Poland and the Netherlands. The song topped hit charts and, on 3 May 2006, was named Norway's official Russ-song of the year. It was also the most popular song at The Gathering demo party 2006. An English version titled "Now You're Gone", sung by Sebastian Westwood, using unrelated lyrics, was released in December 2007.

Lyrics and composition
The Swedish lyrics of "Boten Anna" tell the story of a female IRC user who the vocalist believes is a bot but later finds out to be a beautiful woman, although she will always remain a bot in his eyes. The song is based on an actual experience of Basshunter. His friend said he would create a bot with administrative capabilities to keep order in his channel, #BassHunter.se; when this happened Jonas saw a new user with administrative capabilities named "Anna" enter the channel, and naturally thought this was the bot. Months later, he learned that Anna was actually not a bot, but was his friend's girlfriend; the embarrassment, he says, inspired him to create the song.

Despite the esoteric subject of the lyrics, the song was well received by mainstream media, albeit the word bot was frequently mistaken for boat - the Swedish word bot ("bot") is commonly pronounced almost the same as båt ("boat") in the unusual dialect spoken by Altberg (Basshunter). The double meaning of the word kanal — which can refer to an IRC channel, as well as a canal, added to the confusion.

"Boten Anna" has a tempo of 140 beats per minute and is written in the key of A minor.

Music video
The video to the song deliberately plays on double meanings. It shows Basshunter riding a sightseeing pedal boat down the Malmö City Canal. The "A" on the boat is merely a marking to differentiate from other loaned pedal boats in the canal. Music video features text-based chat system for instant messaging mIRC.

Reception 

Brynjar Mår from FM957 recommended the song and said that "Boten Anna" is hilarious dance song and has a addictive melody. Tom Jerry Boman in his ranking of summer hits for Mitt i described "Boten Anna" as the most unlikely summer torment of all time but he noted it is both festive and gives nerds a certain amount of fresh feeling.

Chart performance 
In August 2006 "Boten Anna" peaked at number one the on Norwegian ringtones chart.

Adaptations 
In the Dutch Top 40 in the Netherlands, a spoof of the song peaked at No. 6 in weeks 38 and 39 of 2006. It is also called "Boten Anna" and it is by Gebroeders Ko (they also made an English and German version), who also made other Dutch versions of known songs like "Dragostea Din Tei". Although they knew the original song wasn't about a boat, they translated it as if it were (one called Anna). "Boten" is the plural form of "boat" in Dutch. In November another spoof of the song, again by Gebroeders Ko, charted the Dutch Top 40. In week 47 the song called "Sinterklaas Boot (Boten Anna)" charted in the Dutch Top 40 and peaked at number 7. This version of "Boten Anna" is about the boat of Sinterklaas.

An Israeli band called Chovevei Tzion (חובבי ציון) spoofed "Boten Anna" with their popular single, "Rotze Banot" (רוצה בנות, meaning "I Want Girls"), which was extensively spoofed in turn. Na Nach Breslov singer Hazamir put the melody to his song "Rotzeh Tisot" (רוצה טיסות, meaning "I want flights", 2007), which is about wishing to make the thrice a year pilgrimages to Rabbi Nachman's grave.

In 2021 "Boten Anna" was covered by Millennium Project.

"Now You're Gone" 

An English version of "Boten Anna" titled "Now You're Gone", sung by Sebastian Westwood using unrelated lyrics by DJ Mental Theo's Bazzheadz which was originally released in 2006, became the music to a video by Basshunter with the same title in November 2007. The video and the track were met with world chart success and became the most requested record in summer holiday resorts around Europe in early 2008. As people returning from their holidays wanted to hear it again, TV channels in the UK were inundated with requests for the video. On 13 January 2008, "Now You're Gone" entered number one in the UK Singles Chart and spent five weeks at the top of the chart, ending Leon Jackson's three week run with "When You Believe". In the sixth week after the song's release it was knocked off the top by Welsh songstress Duffy, with her song "Mercy".

Track listing
CD single (9 May 2006)
"Boten Anna" (Radio Mix) – 3:29
"Boten Anna" (Club Mix) – 5:26

CD single (4 September 2006)
"Boten Anna" (Radio Edit) – 3:29
"Boten Anna" (Club Remix) – 5:26
"Boten Anna" (DJ Micro Spankin Club Remix) – 5:30
"Boten Anna" (Backslash Fluffy Style Remix) – 4:40
"Boten Anna" (SkillsToPayTheBills Remix) – 4:34
"Boten Anna" (Instrumental) – 3:20

Charts

Weekly charts

Year-end charts

Certifications

Awards

See also
 List of number-one singles of the 2000s (Sweden)
 List of number-one songs of the 2000s (Denmark)
 List of number-one singles of 2007 (Finland)
 List of Dutch Top 40 number-one singles of 2006

References

External links
 

2006 songs
Artificial intelligence in fiction
Basshunter songs
2006 singles
Number-one singles in Denmark
Dutch Top 40 number-one singles
Number-one singles in Sweden
Songs written by Basshunter
Warner Music Sweden singles
Songs based on actual events
Swedish-language songs
Song recordings produced by Basshunter